Jeannine Pelland (born 21 May 1931 in Montreal) was a former President of the Order of nurses of Quebec.

References

Knights of the National Order of Quebec
Canadian nurses
Canadian women nurses
People from Montreal
1931 births
Living people
20th-century Canadian women